Fachruddin Wahyudi Aryanto (born 19 February 1989) is an Indonesian professional footballer who plays as a centre-back for and captains Liga 1 club Madura United and the Indonesia national team.

Club career

Persepam Madura Utama
He was signed for Persepam Madura Utama to play in Indonesia Super League in the 2013 season. Fachruddin made his league debut on 16 January 2013 in a match against Persela Lamongan at the Surajaya Stadium, Lamongan.

Sriwijaya
On 12 November 2014, Fachruddin was signed for Sriwijaya to play in the Indonesia Super League in the 2015 season. He made his debut on 4 April 2015 in a match against Persipasi Bandung Raya at the Gelora Sriwijaya Stadium, Palembang.

Madura United
He was signed for Madura United to play in Liga 1 in the 2017 season. Fachruddin made his debut on 16 April 2017 in a match against Bali United. On 26 September 2017, Fachruddin scored his first goal for Madura United against Persegres Gresik United in the 72nd minute at the Petrokimia Stadium, Gresik. On 13 October 2017, he scored the opening goal in a match against Borneo with scoring from header in the 35th minute. On 5 November 2017, he scored in a 3–1 win over Barito Putera. On 8 December 2018, he scored the opening goal in a 2–1 win against Persela Lamongan.

Persija Jakarta (loan)
In 2019, Fachruddin was signed for Persija Jakarta to play in the Liga 1, on loan from Madura United. He made his debut on 1 September 2019 in a match against Badak Lampung at the Patriot Candrabaga Stadium, Bekasi.

International career
Fachruddin made his first international caps for Indonesia in a match against Laos in the 2012 AFF Championship. He scored his first international goal for Indonesia in a match against Philippines in the 2016 AFF Championship

Fachruddin was called up as one of the three overage players for the 2021 SEA Games, also captained the U23 national team. He scored a goal against Timor-Leste U23, and help the team win the bronze medal.

Fachruddin also captained the national team at the 2023 Asian Cup qualification at Kuwait. He scored his third international senior goals against Nepal in a 7-0 win, helping the team qualify for the 2023 AFC Asian Cup.

On 24 September 2022, Fachruddin scored a goal, through a header from Pratama Arhan's long throw-in, in a friendly match against Curaçao in a 3-2 win.

Career statistics

International

International goals
Scores and results list Indonesia's goal tally first.

Honours

International
Indonesia
 AFF Championship runner-up: 2016, 2020
 Aceh World Solidarity Cup runner-up: 2017
Indonesia Olympic
 Southeast Asian Games  Bronze medal: 2021

Individual 
 Liga 1 Best Eleven: 2018
 Indonesia Soccer Championship A Best XI: 2016

References

External links 
 
 

1989 births
Living people
People from Klaten Regency
Sportspeople from Central Java
Javanese people
Indonesian footballers
Indonesia international footballers
PSS Sleman players
Persepam Madura Utama players
Sriwijaya F.C. players
Madura United F.C. players
Persija Jakarta players
Liga 1 (Indonesia) players
Indonesian Premier Division players
Association football defenders
Competitors at the 2021 Southeast Asian Games
Southeast Asian Games bronze medalists for Indonesia
Southeast Asian Games medalists in football